Howard R. "Pee Wee" Montgomery (January 5, 1916 – July 30, 1980) was an American football and basketball player and coach. He served as the head football coach at Arkansas State Teachers College—now known as the University of Central Arkansas—in Conway, Arkansas from 1947 to 1951, compiling a record of 26–17–5. Montgomery was also the head basketball coach at Arkansas State Teachers for one season, in 1948–49, tallying a mark of 14–11.

Head coaching record

College football

References

External links
 

1916 births
1980 deaths
Basketball coaches from Texas
Central Arkansas Bears basketball coaches
Central Arkansas Bears football coaches
Central Arkansas Bears football players
High school football coaches in Arkansas
People from Temple, Texas
Players of American football from Texas